K. Sridhar (born 27 May 1961) is an Indian scientist conducting research in the area of theoretical high energy physics and a writer of fiction.

Career

K. Sridhar obtained a PhD in Physics in 1990 from Mumbai University. After his doctoral studies he worked in the University of London and CERN, Geneva. He has collaborative associations with CERN, Geneva; LAPP, Annency; DAMTP, Cambridge and University of Orsay, Paris. He was a Professor of Theoretical Physics at the Tata Institute of Fundamental Research, Mumbai till May, 2021 and is now a faculty member at the Azim Premji University, Bengaluru.

Research

His current interest is primarily in theories of extra dimensions and compositeness but he has also made contributions to quantum chromodynamics, supersymmetry, grand unification and electroweak physics. He has made significant contributions to brane-world models of extra dimensions, quarkonium physics and R-parity violating supersymmetry. He has published a book Particle Physics of Brane Worlds and Extra Dimensions which is published by Cambridge University Press in the series Cambridge Monographs on Mathematical Physics .

Literature

Sridhar's debut novel, Twice Written was published by Popular Prakashan, Mumbai in 2011. This novel addresses important existential and philosophical questions through the lives of three young people living in Bombay in the 80's. Twice Written was reviewed in The Hindu and the Deccan Herald.

A critical edition of Twice Written was published in 2019 by Curato, Mumbai.

Sridhar has begun working on his second novel, Ajita.

References

External links 
Scientific publications of K. Sridhar on INSPIRE-HEP

1961 births
Living people
20th-century Indian physicists
People associated with CERN